

The Parama Weera Vibhushanaya (PWV) (Sinhala: පරම වීර වීභූෂණය parama vīra vibhūṣaṇaya; Tamil: பரம வீர விபுஷனைய) is Sri Lanka's highest military decoration, awarded for acts of exceptional valour in wartime. Parama Weera Vibhushanaya translates as the ""Decoration of Supreme Heroism", and the award is granted for "individual acts of gallantry and conspicuous bravery of the most exceptional order in the face of the enemy". Corporal  Gamini Kularatne, was the first recipient. , the medal has been awarded 31 times, of which all were posthumous and arose from actions in the Sri Lankan Civil War. Of the 31 awardees, 28 have been from the Sri Lanka Army, two have been from the Sri Lanka Navy and one has been from the Sri Lanka Air Force.

Ceylon used the British awards system and continued post-independence until 1956, when British imperial honours were suspended. New awards were instituted in 1981. PWV is equivalent to the Victoria Cross in the United Kingdom, the Medal of Honor in the United States and Param Vir Chakra in India.

History 
From its formation the Ceylon Defence Force used British military decorations. The practice was continued after Ceylon gained independence in 1948 and the formation of the Ceylon Army in 1949, the Royal Ceylon Navy in 1950, and the Royal Ceylon Air Force in 1951. Following up on his election promise, S. W. R. D. Bandaranaike suspended imperial honours. This meant only service medals such as the Ceylon Armed Services Long Service Medal, the Efficiency Decoration (Ceylon) and the Efficiency Medal (Ceylon) were awarded. No gallantry medals were award during the 1971 JVP Insurrection. In 1972, Ceylon became a republic as the Republic of Sri Lanka. On 1 September 1981, President J. R. Jayewardene instituted new Sri Lankan awards for gallantry the Parama Weera Vibhushanaya(PWV), Weerodara Vibhushanaya(WV), Weera Wickrama Vibhushanaya(WWV), Rana Wickrama Padakkama(RWV), and the Rana Sura Padakkama(RSP) by the Gazette Extraordinary No. 156/5 of 1982.

Authority and privileges 
As the highest award for valour in Sri Lanka, Parama Weera Vibhushanaya is always the first award to be presented at an awards ceremony by the President of Sri Lanka which includes the medal and a sanasa (award scroll). Recipients of the decoration can use the post-nominal letters "PWV" and it is always the first decoration worn in a row of medals and it is the first set of post-nominal letters used to indicate any decoration. Since all awards have been posthumous no tradition exists that require "all ranks to salute a bearer of the Parama Weera Vibhushanaya", nor does it provide for any  annuity or monitory benefits for the recipient or next of kin other than statuary pension or WNOP pension as with other similar awards such as the Victoria Cross.

Award process
The medal can be awarded to all ranks of the tri services, to both regular and volunteer forces, in recognition of:

Field commanders report actions that fulfill the conditions for a PWV to their respective service commanders, who review these reports and, if satisfactory, forward an official recommendation to an awards board composed of officers from the three armed services branches for further review. The board's report is sent to the office of the President who, as commander in chief, has final authority on the award. 

As of 2018, all recipients of this award were killed or missing in action- no living serviceperson has ever worn the medal or the ribbon bar, or used the post-nominal letters to date, effectively making the PWV an exclusively posthumous award.

Recipients

References

Army, Sri Lanka. (1st Edition - October 1999). "50 YEARS ON" - 1949-1999, Sri Lanka Army 
Sri Lankan military awards and decorations

External links
Award Website (Sinhala)
Ministry of Defence, Sri Lanka
Sri Lanka Army
Sri Lanka Navy
Sri Lanka Air Force

Military awards and decorations of Sri Lanka
Awards established in 1981